Michel Seymour (born 1954) is a Canadian philosopher from Quebec and a professor at the Université de Montréal, where he has been teaching analytical philosophy (philosophy of language and philosophy of mind) since 1990.

Biography
After having obtained a Ph.D. in philosophy from the Université du Québec à Trois-Rivières in 1986, he continued to study in the same field for several years at the Oxford University under the direction of John McDowell and at the University of California, Los Angeles under the direction of Tyler Burge. He was president of the Société de philosophie du Québec from 1994 to 1996.

He published in various English language philosophy journals including the Journal of Philosophy and Philosophical Studies as well as many more in French. He is also the author of several books and director of collective works.

Main ideas
In the domain of philosophy of language, Michel Seymour holds an institutional and communitarian conception of language inspired in part from the thought of Ludwig Wittgenstein which he opposes to the idealism of Gottlob Frege, to the inneism of Noam Chomsky and to the psychologism of John Searle. According to Seymour, speaking a language is a rule-governed activity, where the rules express the social conditions of expression-use. The rules are specified by social conventions. The meaning of expressions is indeterminate, because the rules cannot anticipate all cases. Accordingly, Seymour endorses a semantics based on assertability conditions inspired from Saul Kripke which ties the meaning of expressions to their conventional usage.

In the domain of political philosophy, Seymour starts from John Rawls's Political Liberalism to defend a conception of collective rights equal in validity and importance to individual rights, a position which notably runs counter to that of Will Kymlicka on the subject. According to Seymour, liberalism cannot rest content with an attitude of toleration based on mere respect, but must rather foster an attitude of recognition based on mutual appreciation. This should be borne out in public policy aiming to the appreciation of peoples. 

Seymour builds on this political liberalism to defend an inclusive conception of laïcité, which asks that institutions remain neutral and that individuals remain free. This would allow state employees to wear religious symbols, unless they occupy high-authority positions (President, Supreme Court Justice, etc).

Seymour is also well-known for supporting the independence of Quebec.

Works

English
 Québec Nationalism and Canadian Federalism, January 2001
 Exchange of letters between Michel Seymour and readers of the Inroads journal, November–December 2000
 On Redefining the Nation (PDF)
 Québec and Canada at the Crossroads: A Nation within a Nation (PDF)
 The anti-democratic drift of the federal government: A brief concerning Bill C-20
 Quebec's language laws : The long story of a complete misunderstanding (PDF)
 Secession as a Remedial Right (PDF)
 Nation-States, National Minorities and The Draft Treaty (PDF)
 "Introduction : Questioning the Ethnic / Civic Dichotomy", in Rethinking Nationalism, Jocelyne Couture, Kai Nielsen et Michel Seymour (dir), Canadian Journal of Philosophy, Supplementary Volume XXII, 1996, 1-60. 
 "Toward a Cosmopolitan Law of Peoples: Asserting the rights and obligations of persons and nations", in Michel Seymour (dir), The Fate of the Nation-State, Montréal/Kingston, McGill-Queen's University Press, 2004, pp. 403–411.
 "Collective Rights in Multination States: from Ethical Individualism to the Law of Peoples", dans Michel Seymour (dir), The Fate of the Nation-State, Montréal/Kingston, McGill-Queen's University Press, 2004, pp. 105–129.
 "An Inclusive Nation That Does Not Deny Its origins", in Michel Venne, Vive Quebec! New Thinking And New Approaches To the Quebec Nation, Toronto, James and Company, 2001, p. 146-154.
 "On Redefining the Nation", in Nenad Miscevic (ed.), Nationalism and Ethnic Conflict, Chicago and La Salle, Open Court, 2000, 25-55.

French
Une nation peut-elle se donner la constitution de son choix?, 1992
Pensée, langage et communauté. Une perspective anti-individualiste, 1994
La Nation en question, 1999
Nationalité, citoyenneté et solidarité, 1999
Le Pari de la démesure, 2001
Profession: Philosophe, 2005
L'Institution du langage, 2005
De la tolérance à la reconnaissance, 2008
La nation pluraliste (with Jérôme Gosselin-Tapp), 2018

References

External links
 Michel Seymour's personal Website
 Michel Seymour, Department of philosophy, Université de Montréal
 

20th-century Canadian philosophers
French Quebecers
Université du Québec à Trois-Rivières alumni
1954 births
Living people
Scholars of nationalism
Canadian political philosophers